The 35th annual Berlin International Film Festival was held from 15 to 26 February 1985. The Golden Bear was awarded to East German film Die Frau und der Fremde  directed by Rainer Simon and British film Wetherby directed by David Hare. The retrospective was dedicated to Special effects.

Jury

The following people were announced as being on the jury for the festival:
 Jean Marais, actor (France) - Jury President
 Max von Sydow, actor (Sweden)
 Alberto Sordi, actor, screenwriter and director (Italy)
 Regimantas Adomaitis, actor (Soviet Union)
 Sheila Benson, journalist and film critic (United States)
 Wolfgang Kohlhaase, writer (East Germany)
 Onat Kutlar, poet, essayist and screenwriter (Turkey)
 Luis Megino, writer and producer (Spain)
 Ingrid Scheib-Rothbart, head of the Goethe-Institut of New York (West Germany)
 , producer (West Germany)
 István Szabó, director and screenwriter (Hungary)

Films in competition
The following films were in competition for the Golden Bear:

Out of competition
 2010: The Year We Make Contact, directed by Peter Hyams (USA)
 Brazil, directed by Terry Gilliam (United Kingdom)
 Country, directed by Richard Pearce (USA)
 , directed by Bernhard Wicki (West Germany)
 Niemanns Zeit – Ein deutscher Heimatfilm, directed by Horst Kurnitzky and Marion Schmid (West Germany)
 東京裁判 Tōkyō Saiban, directed by Masaki Kobayashi (Japan)
 雅马哈鱼档 Yamaha yudang, directed by Liang Zhang (China)

Key
{| class="wikitable" width="550" colspan="1"
| style="background:#FFDEAD;" align="center"| †
|Winner of the main award for best film in its section
|}

Retrospective

The following films were shown in the retrospective "Special Effects":

Awards
The following prizes were awarded by the Jury:
 Golden Bear: 
 Die Frau und der Fremde by Rainer Simon
 Wetherby by David Hare
 Silver Bear – Special Jury Prize: Szirmok, virágok, koszorúk by László Lugossy
 Silver Bear for Best Director: Robert Benton for Places in the Heart
 Silver Bear for Best Actress: Jo Kennedy for Wrong World
 Silver Bear for Best Actor: Fernando Fernán Gómez for Stico
 Silver Bear for an outstanding single achievement: Tolomush Okeyev for Potomok belogo barsa
 Silver Bear for an outstanding artistic contribution: Ronja Rövardotter
 Honourable Mention: 
 Damiano Damiani for Pizza Connection
 Les enfants
 Tarık Akan for Pehlivan
FIPRESCI Award
Tōkyō saiban by Masaki Kobayashi

Literature
 Brigitte Tast: Als Farbe das Grau, als Format der Innenblick. 35. Internationale Filmfestspiele Berlin 1985, Schellerten 2014,

References

External links
35th Berlin International Film Festival 1985
1985 Berlin International Film Festival
Berlin International Film Festival:1985 at Internet Movie Database

35
1985 film festivals
1985 in West Germany
1980s in West Berlin
Berlin